Acleris nivisellana, the snowy-shouldered acleris moth, is a species of moth of the family Tortricidae. It is found in North America, where it has been recorded from southern Canada and the northern United States, south in the east to Maryland and Virginia, and south in the west to California.

The wingspan is 15–17 mm. The forewings are white with a large blackish semicircular patch along the costa and irregular patches of light grey mixed with brown in the median area and along the inner margin. There is a dark spot near the inner margin in the antemedial area and the subterminal area is dark grey. The hindwings are brownish grey. Adults have been recorded on wing from March to November, probably in two generations per year.

The larvae feed on Crataegus, Malus (including Malus pumila), Physocarpus malvaceus, Prunus pensylvanica, Sorbus (including Sorbus scopulina) species.

References

Moths described in 1879
nivisellana
Moths of North America